The 2015–16 season was the Esteghlal Football Club's 15th season in the Persian Gulf Pro League, their 22nd consecutive season in the top division of Iranian football, and 70th year in existence as a football club. They also competed in the Hazfi Cup.

Club

Current Management Team

Other information

|-

Kit
Supplier: 361 Degrees / Sponsor: RIRA, Samsung, 3090, Kerman Motor Company

Kit information

First team squad
Last updated: 29 May 2016

Persian Gulf Pro League squad

 List of Esteghlal squad in Iran league Organization
 [U19 = Under 19 Player | U21 = Under 21 Player | U23 = Under 23 Player]

New contracts

Transfers

In

Summer

Winter

Out

Summer

Winter

Loan in

Loan out

Summer

Winter

Competitions

Overall

|-align="left" style="background:#DCDCDC"
! colspan="19"|Last updated: 29 May 2016

Note: Current Position/Round Only use for team still a part of Competition.

Competition record

Persian Gulf Pro League

Standings

Results summary

Results by round

Matches

Hazfi Cup

Friendly Matches

Pre-season

Mid-season

Statistics

Appearances and goals

Starting 11
Considering starts in all competitions.

{| class="infobox" style="width:180px;"
|-
|
|

Disciplinary record
Includes all competitive matches. Players with 1 card or more are included only.

Top scorers
The list is sorted by shirt number when total goals are equal.

Top Assister
The list is sorted by shirt number when total assists are equal.

Clean sheets
The list is sorted by shirt number when total clean sheets are equal.

Goals conceded
The list is sorted by shirt number when total 'minutes played' are equal.

Summary

Awards

Team

Player

See also
 2015–16 Persian Gulf Pro League
 2015–16 Hazfi Cup

References

External links
 Iran Premier League Statistics
 Persian League

Esteghlal F.C. seasons
Esteghlal